"Love Is..." is a song by avant-garde band King Missile. It was the only single from the band's 1994 album King Missile.

Content
In "Love Is...," a dirge-like track with elements of doom metal, frontman John S. Hall dryly recites several examples of what love is ("beautiful / Like birds that sing") and is not ("ugly / Like rats / In a puddle of vomit"). The chorus consists of Hall ominously chanting, "Love is beautiful."

Maxi-single
The "Love Is..." maxi-single was intended for promotional use only, and not supposed to be sold; nonetheless, copies are sometimes available in "used" sections of record stores, because some people who received the maxi-single sold it anyway.

Track listing
All lyrics by Hall. All music by Roger Murdock, Dave Rick, and Chris Xefos.

"Love Is..." [clean version] – 3:38
This "clean" version is identical to the album version except for the partial muting of a word that the King Missile liner notes claim is "shipload" but may actually be "shitload." (According to Hall, "on the [King Missile] lyric sheet we [the band] submitted to Atlantic, we changed all the curse words to acceptable words, figuring nobody would listen to the record, and we [would] get away with not having a warning label. This actually worked!")
"These People" – 4:26
This track also appears on King Missile.
"Lost Land" – 4:32
This track appears exclusively on the maxi-single.
"What If" [alternate version] – 2:24
This track, which appears exclusively on the maxi-single, differs from the King Missile version of "What If" in that the lyrics are spoken throughout rather than both spoken and sung.
"Love Is..." [album version] – 3:38

Music video
The video for "Love Is..." was directed by Richard Kern. The video contrasts shots of the band performing in a white room with shots of a dark, sordid party at which attendees engage in heterosexual, homosexual, interracial and zoophilic partnerships.

MTV refused to air the video. Hall believes this rejection was motivated by the shots of multi-instrumentalist Xefos kissing another man.

References

King Missile songs
Experimental rock songs
1994 singles
Songs written by John S. Hall
1994 songs
Songs written by Dave Rick
Songs written by Chris Xefos